INS Ganga (F22) was a  guided-missile frigate of the Indian Navy. Built in Mumbai by Mazagon Dock Limited, she was commissioned into the Indian Navy on 30 December 1985. She was retired from active service on 28 May 2017, and was decommissioned on 22 March 2018.

Operations

Commissioning 
INS Ganga was commissioned on 30 December 1985 while berthed on the South Breakwater, Naval Dockyard, Mumbai (the called Bombay). Her first Commanding Officer was Captain Kailash Kohli (later Vice Admiral). The ship completed her post-commissioning trials in a record time of three months and joined the Western Fleet in mid April 1986.

UNOSOM II
While the UN Security Council Resolution 954, extended the UN mandate for UNOSOM II in Somalia to March 1995, the United States and other NATO members of the mission abandoned the peacekeeping effort and withdrew from Somalia over a year earlier. As the mission approached its scheduled end, the situation on the ground continued to deteriorate.

Decommissioning 
INS Ganga was decommissioned from active service on 22 March 2018.

References

1981 ships
Godavari-class frigates
Frigates of the Indian Navy
Ships built in India